Animals' Rights: Considered in Relation to Social Progress is an 1892 book by the English social reformer Henry Stephens Salt. It is widely considered to be the first explicit treatment of the concept of animal rights.

Content 
In the book, Salt argues against the idea of speciesism, though the term was not coined for another 76 years.

The book also argues against vivisection, misuse of horses and wild animals, hunting and fishing, and the fur trade, and in favour of vegetarianism.

Reception 
James H. Hyslop reviewed the book contemporaneously for the International Journal of Ethics, strongly praising the book's intentions "its spirit shows the finest feelings a moral being can possess" but also arguing that it failed to present a theoretical justification for the equal rights it presumes between humans and animals: "No fundamental position, philosophical or theological, is taken as ground for such rights, and hence we have only an exposure of certain logical weaknesses in the defence of existing practices towards animal life."

Hyslop also argues that Salt conflates disparate ethical questions:

the book confuses three distinct problems which ought to be kept distinct from one another. (1) The abstract question of animal rights of any kind; (2) The question of their treatment as sensible beings, whether we accord them the same rights as man or not; and (3) The question of vegetarianism. The last question virtually assumes that they have equal rights with man. On the other hand, some can defend animal rights of a certain kind without including a prohibition of animal food. Then, independently of all questions of rights, others may insist on human conduct towards animals upon the grounds of man's duty to moral law in general.

In 1895, The William and Mary Quarterly said of the work: "Mr. Salt is undoubtedly ahead of his age by many years."

Editions 
The first American edition published in 1894, included an essay "On Vivisection in America" by Albert Leffingwell. 

A reprint of the first edition of the book was published in 1980, with a preface by the Australian philosopher Peter Singer, who is well known for his work on the ethics of treatment towards animals (specifically in the book Animal Liberation). The 1980 reissue prompted a review from Stephen Clark who praised Salt's book with some provisos. He states that Salt's attempt to blame the treatment of non-human animals on the theological doctrine of man having "dominion" over the natural world was mistaken.

References

External links 
 Animals' Rights: Considered in Relation to Social Progress at the Animal Rights Library
 Animals' Rights: Considered in Relation to Social Progress at the Internet Archive

1894 non-fiction books
Books about animal rights
Books about vegetarianism
English-language books
George Bell & Sons books
Vegetarian-related mass media